Art History is the 2012 debut album of Chicago indie pop quartet California Wives. It was released in October 2012 on Vagrant Records.

In an interview with Billboard, the band's vocalist and guitarist, Jayson Kramer, explained that the album was recorded in early 2012 in New York City with the help of Claudius Mittendorfer, who has worked with Muse, Interpol and Neon Indian.

Track listing

References

2012 debut albums
Vagrant Records albums